The Minister for Public Expenditure, National Development Plan Delivery and Reform is a senior minister in the Government of Ireland and leads the Department of Public Expenditure, National Development Plan Delivery and Reform.

The current Minister for Public Expenditure, National Development Plan Delivery and Reform is Paschal Donohoe, TD. He is assisted by:
Ossian Smyth, TD – Minister of State for Public Procurement, Open Government and eGovernment 
Patrick O'Donovan, TD – Minister of State for the Office of Public Works

The department was created in July 2011, taking over some of the functions of the Department of Finance.

List of ministers

Notes

References

External links
Department of Public Expenditure, National Development Plan Delivery and Reform

2011 establishments in Ireland
Minister
Government ministers of the Republic of Ireland
Lists of government ministers of Ireland